The Turakina River is a river of the southwestern North Island of New Zealand.

The river flows near Papanui Junction and Turakina. Pā sites existed at Te Maire, Pukemata, Toakaituna, and Maipaua. Donald McLean arranged signing of the Rangitīkei–Turakina deed with some of the owners on 15 May 1849, when The Crown claimed the Rangitīkei Block. Scottish settlers arrived from the late 1860s.

Floods on the Turakina are frequent, including 1897, 1920, 1939, 1940, 2013, 2015, 2017 and 2021.

Te Araroa long-distance walkway crosses the river at the beach at Koitiata at low tide. The outlet of the river changes frequently, moving up to  along the lagoon, which is formed by a sand bar. In 1997 an outlet was dug to reduce flooding.

12% of samples taken at the lagoon in 5 years to 2022 found E. coli levels too high for swimming. 81.1% of land in the catchment is used for animal grazing. Native bush covers only 8.5%.

Redfin bully live in the river.

Much of it is a gravel road.

The river is crossed by SH3 and by the Marton–New Plymouth railway.

References

Rivers of Manawatū-Whanganui
Rivers of New Zealand